Mudikkode is a small village in Thrissur district Kerala India. This place is situated 10 km away from Thrissur city. One of the important place is Pananchery Mudikkode Siva Temple. In belief, it is one of the temple out of 108 Shiva Temples which is built by Parashurama. 

Suburbs of Thrissur city